Thoklung is a village development committee in the Himalayas of Terhathum District in the Kosi Zone of eastern Nepal. At the time of the 1991 Nepal census it had a population of 3010 people living in 506 individual households. 

The northeastern  Atharai municipality eastern part of Nepal, belongs to Ward No. 7, Thoklung.  The main occupations of the people's here are animal husbandry, agriculture and foreign employment.  60% of the land is fallow.

The area is inhabited by Limbu (Kandangwa and Maden) Chhetri Brahmins (Phuyal, Parajuli, Chamlagai, Dhamla, Nepal Lamichhane, Upreti and Baral) as well as Tamang, Damai, Kami and Sarki.  The main of this territory

The problems are also irrigation and drinking water.  Due to the lack of drinking water, half of the population has migrated from here to Jhapa, Morang, Sunsari and Kathmandu since 2065/66.BS

Thoklung is the first village to generated its own electricity and all households have access to electricity.  There is one higher secondary, one lower secondary and seven primary schools in this territory, but some primary schools have been closed due to shortage of students.  Ranichautar, Manedada and Dhalkebar is a popular place of this territory's and the holy temple Bhagwati is considered to be the center of religious faith.

नेपालको सुदुरपुर्बी दिसामा अबस्थित तेह्रथुम जिल्लाको उतरपुर्बी आठाराइ गाउपलिका स्थिति  ७ नम्बर वर्डमा पर्द्छ। यहाँ मानिसको मुख्य पेशा पसु पालन, खेतीपाती र वैदेशिक रोजगार रहेको छ । यश छेत्रको ६०% जमीन बाजो छ यहाँ मकै, कोदो, फपर, तोरि, मास, गत, सिमि र जुनेलो लगाएतका खेती गरिन्छ।

यश छेत्रमा लिम्बु( कन्दङ्वा र मादेन) छेत्री ब्राह्मण (फुयाल, पराजुली, चम्लागाइ, धमला, नेपाल लामिछाने, उप्रेती र बराल)तेस्तै तामाङ, दमाई, कामी र सार्किको पनि बसोबास रहेको छ । यो छेत्रको मुख्य समस्या सिचाइ र पिउने पनि रहेको छ । पिउने पनिको अभावको कारण यहाँबाट २०६५/६६ देखि अहिलेसम्म आधा जनसंख्या झापा मोरङ सुनसरी र काठमाडौमा बसाइँसराइ गरिसकेको छ्न। 

थोक्लुङ्ग गाउपालिकामै सबैभन्दा पहिलो आफ्नै बिजुली उत्पादन गरेर सबै घरमा बिजुलीको सुबिधा रहेको छ । यश छेत्रमा एक उच्चमाध्यमिक एक,निम्नमाध्यमिक र ७ प्राथमिकत बिद्यालय रहेकोमा केही प्राथमिक बिधालयभने बिध्याथि अभावले बन्द भएसकेकाछन। रानिचौतार, मानेडाडा ढल्केबर यहाँका रमढिय ठाउहुन भने पबित्र मन्दिर भगवति यश छेत्रको धार्मिक आस्थाको केन्द्र मानिन्छ

Updated by Loken

References

External links
UN map of the municipalities of Terhathum District

Populated places in Tehrathum District